Shenzhou 16 is a planned Chinese spaceflight to the Tiangong space station, expected to launch in May 2023 on board a Shenzhou spacecraft. It will carry three People's Liberation Army Astronaut Corps (PLAAC) taikonauts. The mission will be the eleventh crewed and sixteenth flight overall of the Shenzhou program.

Background 
Shenzhou 16 will be the fifth long-duration spaceflight to the Tiangong space station, and will last about six months.

As of December 2022, the spacecraft has completed construction and testing, and is on standby for an emergency rescue mission of the Shenzhou 15 crew. Meanwhile, the Shenzhou 17 and 18 spacecraft are currently being assembled and tested.

Mission 
The flight will launch in May 2023, following the launch of Tianzhou 6 and near the end of the Shenzhou 15 mission. The two crews will perform a handover in space prior to the departure of the Shenzhou 15 crew in May 2023.

Crew

See also
Shenzhou (spacecraft)
Tiangong space station

References 

 

2023 in China
Future human spaceflights
Shenzhou program
Tiangong program
2023 in spaceflight